Spatalistis orbigera is a species of moth of the family Tortricidae. It is found in India (Assam).

The wingspan is about 13 mm. The forewings are rather dark fuscous, with oblique ferruginous-brown striae sprinkled with blackish. There are three round whitish-ochreous blotches becoming whitish on their margins. There are several small whitish dots on the posterior part of the costa and termen. The hindwings are pale grey, thinly scaled in the disc and towards the base, suffused with dark grey towards the apex and on the termen. The veins are dark grey. Adults have been recorded on wing in April.

References

Moths described in 1912
orbigera